

Events

Pre-1600
 161 – Marcus Aurelius and L. Commodus (who changes his name to Lucius Verus) become joint emperors of Rome on the death of Antoninus Pius.
1138 – Konrad III von Hohenstaufen was elected king of Germany at Coblenz in the presence of the papal legate Theodwin.
1277 – The University of Paris issues the last in a series of condemnations of various philosophical and theological theses.
1573 – A peace treaty is signed between the Ottoman Empire and the Republic of Venice, ending the Ottoman–Venetian War and leaving Cyprus in Ottoman hands.

1601–1900
1799 – Napoleon Bonaparte captures Jaffa in Palestine and his troops proceed to kill more than 2,000 Albanian captives.
1814 – Emperor Napoleon I of France wins the Battle of Craonne.
1827 – Brazilian marines unsuccessfully attack the temporary naval base of Carmen de Patagones, Argentina.
  1827   – Shrigley abduction: Ellen Turner is abducted by Edward Gibbon Wakefield, a future politician in colonial New Zealand.
1850 – Senator Daniel Webster gives his "Seventh of March" speech endorsing the Compromise of 1850 in order to prevent a possible civil war.
1862 – American Civil War: Union forces engage Confederate troops at the Battle of Pea Ridge in northwestern Arkansas.
1876 – Alexander Graham Bell is granted a patent for an invention he calls the "telephone".
1900 – The German liner  becomes the first ship to send wireless signals to shore.

1901–present
1902 – Second Boer War: Boers, led by Koos de la Rey, inflict the biggest defeat upon the British since the beginning of the war, at Tweebosch.
1914 – Prince William of Wied arrives in Albania to begin his reign as King.
1931 – The Parliament House of Finland is officially inaugurated in Helsinki, Finland.
1941 – Günther Prien and the crew of German submarine U-47, one of the most successful U-boats of World War II, disappear without a trace.
1945 – World War II: American troops seize the Ludendorff Bridge over the Rhine river at Remagen.
1950 – Cold War: The Soviet Union issues a statement denying that Klaus Fuchs served as a Soviet spy.
1951   – Northwest Orient Airlines Flight 307 crashes in Lynnhurst, Minneapolis, killing 15 people.
1951 – Korean War: Operation Ripper: United Nations troops led by General Matthew Ridgway begin an assault against Chinese forces.
  1951   – Iranian prime minister Ali Razmara is assassinated by Khalil Tahmasebi, a member of the Islamic fundamentalist Fada'iyan-e Islam, inside a mosque in Tehran.
1965 – Bloody Sunday: A group of 600 civil rights marchers is brutally attacked by state and local police in Selma, Alabama.
1967 – The Majelis Permusyawaratan Rakyat Sementara (MPRS), Indonesia's provisional parliament, revoked Sukarno's mandate as President of Indonesia.
1968 – Vietnam War: The United States and South Vietnamese military begin Operation Truong Cong Dinh to root out Viet Cong forces from the area surrounding Mỹ Tho.
1971 – Sheikh Mujibur Rahman, political leader of then East Pakistan (present day-Bangladesh), delivers his historic 7th March speech in the Racecourse Field (Now Suhrawardy Udyan) in Dhaka.
1986 – Challenger Disaster: Divers from the  locate the crew cabin of Challenger on the ocean floor.
1987 – Lieyu massacre: Taiwanese military massacre of 19 unarmed Vietnamese refugees at Donggang, Lieyu, Kinmen. 
1989 – Iran and the United Kingdom break diplomatic relations after a fight over Salman Rushdie and his controversial novel, The Satanic Verses.
1993 – The tugboat Thomas Hebert sank off the coast of New Jersey, USA.
2006 – The terrorist organisation Lashkar-e-Taiba coordinates a series of bombings in Varanasi, India.
2007 – Reform of the House of Lords: The British House of Commons votes to make the upper chamber, the House of Lords, 100% elected.
  2007   – Garuda Indonesia Flight 200 crashes at Adisutjipto International Airport in the Special Region of Yogyakarta, Indonesia, killing 21 people.
2009 – The Real Irish Republican Army kills two British soldiers and injures two other soldiers and two civilians at Massereene Barracks, the first British military deaths in Northern Ireland since the end of The Troubles.
2021 – At least 105 die and 600 are injured in the 2021 Bata explosions in Bata, Equatorial Guinea.

Births

Pre-1600
 189 – Publius Septimius Geta, Roman emperor (d. 211)
 942 – Mu'ayyad al-Dawla, Buyid emir (d. 983)
1437 – Anna of Saxony, Electress of Brandenburg (d. 1512)
1481 – Baldassare Peruzzi, Italian architect and painter (d. 1537)
1482 – Fray Thomas de San Martín, Roman Catholic prelate and bishop (d. 1555)
1543 – John Casimir of the Palatinate-Simmern, German prince and reigning count palatine of Simmern (d. 1592)
1556 – Guillaume du Vair, French lawyer and author (d. 1621)

1601–1900
1671 – Rob Roy MacGregor, Scottish outlaw (d. 1734)
1678 – Filippo Juvarra, Italian architect, designed the Basilica of Superga (d. 1736)
1693 – Clement XIII, pope of the Catholic Church (d. 1769)
1715 – Ewald Christian von Kleist, German soldier and poet (d. 1759)
1723 – Prince Vittorio Amedeo Theodore of Savoy (d. 1725)
1730 – Louis Auguste Le Tonnelier de Breteuil, French soldier and politician, Prime Minister of France (d. 1807)
1765 – Nicéphore Niépce, French inventor, invented photography (d. 1833)
1785 – Alessandro Manzoni, Italian author and poet (d. 1873)
1788 – Antoine César Becquerel, French physicist and biochemist (d. 1878)
1792 – John Herschel, English mathematician and astronomer (d. 1871)
1811 – Increase A. Lapham, American botanist and author (d. 1875)
1837 – Henry Draper, American physician and astronomer (d. 1882)
1839 – Ludwig Mond, German-born chemist and British industrialist who discovered the metal carbonyls (d. 1909)
1841 – William Rockhill Nelson, American businessman and publisher, founded The Kansas City Star (d. 1915)
1843 – Marriott Henry Brosius, American senator (d. 1901)
1849 – Luther Burbank, American botanist and author (d. 1926)
1850 – Champ Clark, American lawyer and politician, 41st Speaker of the United States House of Representatives (d. 1921)
  1850   – Tomáš Garrigue Masaryk, Austrian-Czech sociologist and politician, 1st President of Czechoslovakia (d. 1937)
1857 – Julius Wagner-Jauregg, Austrian physician and academic, Nobel Prize laureate (d. 1940)
1872 – Piet Mondrian, Dutch-American painter (d. 1944)
1873 – Madame Sul-Te-Wan, American actress (d. 1959)
1875 – Maurice Ravel, French pianist, composer, and conductor (d. 1937)
1878 – Boris Kustodiev, Russian painter and stage designer (d. 1927)
1885 – Milton Avery, American painter (d. 1965)
  1885   – John Tovey, 1st Baron Tovey, English admiral (d. 1971)
1886 – Virginia Pearson, American actress (d. 1958)
  1886   – G. I. Taylor, English mathematician and physicist (d. 1975)
  1886   – Wilson Dallam Wallis, American anthropologist (d. 1970)
1888 – William L. Laurence, Lithuanian-American journalist and author (d. 1977)
  1888   – Alidius Tjarda van Starkenborgh Stachouwer, Dutch lawyer and politician, Governor-General of the Dutch East Indies (d. 1978)
1894 – Ana María O'Neill, Puerto Rican scholar and activist (d. 1981)
1895 – Dorothy de Rothschild, English philanthropist and activist (d. 1988)

1901–present
1902 – Heinz Rühmann, German actor (d. 1994)
1903 – Maud Lewis, Canadian folk artist (d. 1970)
1904 – Ivar Ballangrud, Norwegian speed skater (d. 1969)
  1904   – Reinhard Heydrich, German SS officer (d. 1942)
  1904   – Kurt Weitzmann, German-American historian and author (d. 1993)
1908 – Anna Magnani, Italian actress (d. 1973)
1910 – Will Glickman, American playwright (d. 1983)
1911 – Sachchidananda Vatsyayan, Indian modern poet, journalist and author (d. 1987)
  1911   – Stefan Kisielewski, Polish libertarian writer and politician (d. 1991)
1912 – Adile Ayda, Turkish engineer and diplomat (d. 1992)
1913 – Dollard Ménard, Canadian general (d. 1997)
1915 – Jacques Chaban-Delmas, French general and politician, Prime Minister of France (d. 2000)
1917 – Janet Collins, American ballerina and choreographer (d. 2003)
  1917   – Betty Holberton, American engineer and programmer (d. 2001)
1922 – Olga Ladyzhenskaya, Russian mathematician and academic (d. 2004)
  1922   – Mochtar Lubis, Indonesian journalist and author (d. 2004)
  1922   – Peter Murphy, English footballer (d. 1975)
  1922   – Andy Phillip, American basketball player and coach (d. 2001)
1924 – Morton Bard, American psychologist (d. 1997)
  1924   – Bill Boedeker, American football player (d. 2014)
1925 – Rene Gagnon, American soldier (d. 1979)
  1925   – Richard Vernon, British actor (d. 1997)
1927 – James Broderick, American actor and director (d. 1982)
1929 – Dan Jacobson, South African-English author and critic (d. 2014)
1930 – Antony Armstrong-Jones, 1st Earl of Snowdon, English photographer and politician (d. 2017)
  1930   – Robert Trotter, Scottish actor and photographer (d. 2013)
1933 – Jackie Blanchflower, Northern Irish footballer and accountant (d. 1998)
  1933   – Ed Bouchee, American baseball player (d. 2013)
1934 – Willard Scott, American television personality and actor (d. 2021) 
1936 – Florentino Fernández, Cuban-American boxer and coach (d. 2013)
  1936   – Georges Perec, French author and screenwriter (d. 1982)
1938 – David Baltimore, American biologist and academic, Nobel Prize laureate
  1938   – Janet Guthrie, American professional race car driver, first woman to qualify and compete in both the Indianapolis 500 and the Daytona 500 
1939 – Danyel Gérard, French singer-songwriter
1940 – Daniel J. Travanti, American actor
1941 – Piers Paul Read, English historian and author
1942 – Michael Eisner, American businessman
  1942   – Tammy Faye Messner, American evangelist, television personality, and talk show host (d. 2007)
1943 – Chris White, English singer-songwriter and bass player 
1944 – Ranulph Fiennes, English soldier and explorer
  1944   – Townes Van Zandt, American singer-songwriter and guitarist (d. 1997)
1945 – Bob Herbert, American journalist
  1945   – Arthur Lee, American singer-songwriter and musician (d. 2006)
  1945   – Elizabeth Moon, American lieutenant and author
1946 – John Heard, American actor and producer (d. 2017)
1947 – Helen Eadie, Scottish politician (d. 2013)
  1947   – Walter Röhrl, German race car driver
1949 – Ghulam Nabi Azad, Indian politician, Indian Minister of Health and Family Welfare
1950 – Billy Joe DuPree, American football player
  1950   – Franco Harris, American football player and businessman (d. 2022)
  1950   – J. R. Richard, American baseball player and minister (d. 2021) 
1952 – William Boyd, Ghanaian-English author and screenwriter
  1952   – Ernie Isley, American guitarist and songwriter 
  1952   – Viv Richards, Antiguan cricketer and footballer
  1952   – Lynn Swann, American football player, sportscaster, and politician
1954 – Eva Brunne, Swedish bishop
1955 – Tommy Kramer, American football player
1956 – Bryan Cranston, American actor, director, and producer
  1956   – Andrea Levy, English author (d. 2019)
1957 – Robert Harris, English journalist and author
  1957   – Mark Richards, Australian surfer
  1957   – Tomás Yarrington, Mexican economist and politician, Governor of Tamaulipas
1958 – Rick Bass, American author and environmentalist 
  1958   – Rik Mayall, English comedian, actor, and screenwriter (d. 2014)
  1958   – Merv Neagle, Australian footballer and coach (d. 2012)
1959 – Tom Lehman, American golfer
  1959   – Donna Murphy, American actress and singer
1960 – Joe Carter, American baseball player and sportscaster
  1960   – Ivan Lendl, Czech tennis player and coach
  1960   – Jim Spivey, American runner and coach
1961 – David Rutley, English businessman and politician
  1961   – Nicolas Dupont-Aignan, French politician
1962 – Taylor Dayne, American singer-songwriter and actress
1963 – Mike Eagles, Canadian ice hockey player and coach
  1963   – E. L. James, English author
1964 – Bret Easton Ellis, American author and screenwriter
  1964   – Wanda Sykes, American comedian, actress, and screenwriter
1965 – Steve Beuerlein, American football player and sportscaster
  1965   – Jesper Parnevik, Swedish golfer
1966 – Terry Carkner, Canadian ice hockey player and coach
  1966   – Tony Daly, Australian rugby player
1967 – Muhsin al-Ramli, Iraqi author, poet, translator, and academic
  1967   – Ruthie Henshall, English actress, singer, and dancer
  1967   – Ai Yazawa, Japanese author and illustrator
1968 – Jeff Kent, American baseball player
1969 – Massimo Lotti, Italian footballer
  1969   – Hideki Noda, Japanese race car driver
1970 – Rachel Weisz, English-American actress and producer
1971 – Tal Banin, Israeli footballer and manager
  1971   – Peter Sarsgaard, American actor
  1971   – Matthew Vaughn, English director, producer, and screenwriter
1972 – Craig Polla-Mounter, Australian rugby league player
1973 – Jason Bright, Australian race car driver
  1973   – Sébastien Izambard, French tenor and producer 
  1973   – Işın Karaca, English-Turkish singer-songwriter, producer, and actress
1974 – Jenna Fischer, American actress
  1974   – Facundo Sava, Argentinian footballer and manager
1977 – Ronan O'Gara, Irish rugby player and coach
  1977   – Paul Cattermole, British singer and actor
1978 – Jaqueline Jesus, Brazilian psychologist and activist
1979 – Rodrigo Braña, Argentinian footballer
  1979   – Amanda Somerville, American singer-songwriter 
1980 – Murat Boz, Turkish singer-songwriter
  1980   – Eric Godard, Canadian ice hockey player
  1980   – Laura Prepon, American actress 
1981 – Brent Kite, Australian rugby league player
1983 – Manucho, Angolan footballer
  1983   – Sebastián Viera, Uruguayan footballer
1984 – Steve Burtt Jr., American-Ukrainian basketball player
  1984   – Mathieu Flamini, French footballer
  1984   – Jacob Lillyman, Australian rugby league player
  1984   – Lindsay McCaul, American singer-songwriter
1985 – Andre Fluellen, American football player
  1985   – Cameron Prosser, Australian swimmer
  1985   – Gerwyn Price, Welsh darts player
1986 – Ben Griffin, Australian footballer
1987 – Hatem Ben Arfa, French footballer
  1987   – Niclas Bergfors, Swedish ice hockey player
1988 – Larry Asante, American football player
1991 – Michele Rigione, Italian footballer
1994 – Chase Kalisz, American swimmer
  1994   – Jordan Pickford, English footballer
1995 – Jerome Binnom-Williams, English footballer
  1995   – Aboubakar Kamara, French footballer
1996 – Liam Donnelly, Northern Irish footballer
1998 – Amanda Gorman, American poet and activist

Deaths

Pre-1600
 161 – Antoninus Pius, Roman emperor (b. 86)
 413 – Heraclianus, Roman politician and failed usurper
 851 – Nominoe, King (or duke) of Brittany
 974 – John of Gorze, Frankish abbot and diplomat 
1226 – William Longespée, 3rd Earl of Salisbury, English commander (b. 1176)
1274 – Saint Thomas Aquinas, Italian priest and philosopher (b. 1225)
1393 – Bogislaw VI, Duke of Pomerania (b.c. 1350)
1407 – Francesco I Gonzaga, ruler of Mantua
1517 – Maria of Aragon, Queen of Portugal (b. 1482)
1550 – William IV, Duke of Bavaria (b. 1493)
1578 – Margaret Douglas, English daughter of Archibald Douglas, 6th Earl of Angus (b. 1515)

1601–1900
1625 – Johann Bayer, German lawyer and cartographer (b. 1572)
1724 – Pope Innocent XIII (b. 1655)
1767 – Jean-Baptiste Le Moyne, Sieur de Bienville, Canadian politician, 2nd Colonial Governor of Louisiana (b. 1680)
1778 – Charles De Geer, Swedish entomologist and archaeologist (b. 1720) 
1809 – Jean-Pierre Blanchard, French inventor, best known as a pioneer in balloon flight (b. 1753)
1810 – Cuthbert Collingwood, 1st Baron Collingwood, English admiral (b. 1750)
1838 – Robert Townsend, American spy (b. 1753)
1897 – Harriet Ann Jacobs, African American Abolitionist and author (b. 1813)

1901–present
1904 – Ferdinand André Fouqué, French geologist and petrologist (b. 1828)
1913 – Pauline Johnson, Canadian poet and author (b. 1861)
1920 – Jaan Poska, Estonian lawyer and politician, 1st Estonian Minister of Foreign Affairs (b. 1866)
1928 – Robert Abbe, American surgeon and radiologist (b. 1851)
1931 – Akseli Gallen-Kallela, Finnish artist (b. 1865)
1932 – Aristide Briand, French journalist and politician, Prime Minister of France, Nobel Prize laureate (b. 1862)
1934 – Ernst Enno, Estonian poet and author (b. 1875)
1938 – Andreas Michalakopoulos, Greek politician, 116th Prime Minister of Greece (b. 1876)
1947 – Lucy Parsons, American communist anarchist labor organizer (b. c 1853)
1949 – Bradbury Robinson, American football player, physician, and politician (b. 1884)
1952 – Paramahansa Yogananda, Indian guru and philosopher (b. 1893)
1954 – Otto Diels, German chemist and academic, Nobel Prize laureate (b. 1876)
1957 – Wyndham Lewis, English painter and critic (b. 1882)
1961 – Govind Ballabh Pant, Indian lawyer and politician, 2nd Chief Minister of Uttar Pradesh (b. 1887)
1967 – Alice B. Toklas, American writer (b. 1877)
1971 – Richard Montague, American mathematician and philosopher (b. 1930)
1973 – Lalo Ríos, Mexican actor (b. 1927)
1975 – Mikhail Bakhtin, Russian philosopher and critic (b. 1895)
1976 – Wright Patman, American lieutenant, lawyer, and politician (b. 1893)
1981 – Kirill Kondrashin, Russian conductor (b. 1914)
  1981   – Muhammad Zaki Abd al-Qadir, Egyptian journalist and writer (d. 1981) 
1982 – Ida Barney, American astronomer, mathematician, and academic (b. 1886)
1983 – Igor Markevitch, Ukrainian conductor and composer (b. 1912)
1986 – Jacob K. Javits, American colonel and politician, 58th New York State Attorney General (b. 1904)
1988 – Divine, American drag queen and film actor (b. 1945)
  1988   – Ülo Õun, Estonian sculptor (b. 1940)
1991 – Cool Papa Bell, American baseball player (b. 1903)
1993 – Tony Harris, South African cricketer (b. 1916)
  1993   – J. Merrill Knapp, American musicologist (b. 1914)
  1993   – Martti Larni, Finnish writer (b. 1909)
  1993   – Carlo Mazzarella, Italian actor and journalist (b. 1919)
  1993   – Angelo Piccaluga, Italian footballer (b. 1906)
  1993   – Eleanor Sanger, American television producer (b. 1929)
  1993   – Josef Steindl, Austrian economist (b. 1912)
  1993   – Frank Wells, Australian rules footballer (b. 1909)
1997 – Edward Mills Purcell, American physicist and academic, Nobel Prize laureate (b. 1912)
1999 – Sidney Gottlieb, American chemist and theorist (b. 1918)
  1999   – Stanley Kubrick, American director, producer, and screenwriter (b. 1928)
2000 – Pee Wee King, American singer-songwriter (b. 1914)
2001 – Frankie Carle, American pianist and bandleader (b. 1903)
2004 – Paul Winfield, American actor (b. 1941)
2005 – John Box, English production designer and art director (b. 1920)
  2005   – Debra Hill, American screenwriter and producer (b. 1950)
2006 – Gordon Parks, American photographer, director, and composer (b. 1912)
  2006   – Ali Farka Touré, Malian singer-songwriter and guitarist (b. 1939)
2007 – Ronnie Wells, American singer and educator (b. 1943)
2012 – Ravi, Indian director and composer (b. 1926)
  2012   – Włodzimierz Smolarek, Polish footballer and manager (b. 1957)
2013 – Peter Banks, English guitarist and songwriter (b. 1947)
  2013   – Damiano Damiani, Italian director and screenwriter (b. 1922)
  2013   – Frederick B. Karl, American lieutenant and politician (b. 1924)
  2013   – Claude King, American singer-songwriter and guitarist (b. 1923)
2014 – Anatoly Borisovich Kuznetsov, Russian actor and director (b. 1930)
  2014   – Ned O'Gorman, American poet and educator (b. 1929)
  2014   – Victor Shem-Tov, Israeli lawyer and politician, 8th Israeli Minister of Health (b. 1915)
2015 – G. Karthikeyan, Indian lawyer and politician (b. 1949)
  2015   – F. Ray Keyser, Jr., American lawyer and politician, 72nd Governor of Vermont (b. 1927)
  2015   – Yoshihiro Tatsumi, Japanese author and illustrator (b. 1935)
2016 – Adrian Hardiman, Irish lawyer and judge (b. 1951)
  2016   – Leonard Berney, Bergen-Belsen concentration camp liberator (b. 1920)
2017 – Lynne Stewart, American attorney and activist (b. 1939)

Holidays and observances
 Christian feast day:
 Blessed Leonid Feodorov (Russian Greek Catholic Church)
 Perpetua and Felicity
 Siméon-François Berneux (part of The Korean Martyrs)
 March 7 (Eastern Orthodox liturgics)
Maritime Day in Slovenia

References

External links

 BBC: On This Day
 
 Historical Events on March 7

Days of the year
March